Lullington is a civil parish in the South Derbyshire district of Derbyshire, England.  The parish contains six listed buildings that are recorded in the National Heritage List for England.  Of these, one is listed at Grade II*, the middle of the three grades, and the others are at Grade II, the lowest grade.  The parish contains the village of Lullington and the surrounding countryside, and the listed buildings consist of a church and associated structures, a village hall, and three farmhouses.


Key

Buildings

References

Citations

Sources

 

Lists of listed buildings in Derbyshire